St Clare's College is a Catholic school in the south Canberra suburb of Griffith, Australian Capital Territory, Australia, catering for girls from grades 7 to 12. The college was established in 1965.   St Clare's had an enrolment of approximately 1000 students, making it the largest Catholic girls' secondary school in Canberra.

All students participate in a broad academic program and many extra-curricular activities within the context of the Catholic tradition.

On 15 September 2010 St Clare's College students broke a Guinness World Record for the most (872) girls patting their heads and rubbing their stomachs.

History 
St Clare's College was established in 1965 as Catholic Girls' High School Griffith (CGHS Griffith).

Principals 
 Sister Clare Slattery, Founding Principal, 1965–1975
 Sister Placid Tait SGS, 1976–1977
 Brother Gordon Kerr CFC, 1978
 Pat Wall, 1979–1983
 Sister Joan Smith CSB, 1984–1988
 Helen Sheedy, 1989–1992
 Jim Peoples, 1993–2000
 Rita Daniels, 2001–2006
 Ian Garrity, Acting, Semester 1, 2007
 Sandra Darley, Acting, Semester 2, 2007
 Rita Daniels, 2008–2009
 Alison Jeffries, 2009–2012 
 Paul Carroll, 2013–2016
 Brad Cooney, 2017–2021
 Dr Ann Cleary, 2022-present

See also 
 List of schools in the Australian Capital Territory
 Associated southern colleges

References

External links 
 St Clare's College website

Educational institutions established in 1965
Girls' schools in the Australian Capital Territory
Catholic secondary schools in the Australian Capital Territory
1965 establishments in Australia
Alliance of Girls' Schools Australasia